Take It Back, Take It On, Take It Over! is an album by the punk rock band 7 Seconds, released in 2005.

Release
It was promoted with a US tour, titled Our Core, in February and March 2005; they were supported on various parts of it by Groovie Ghoulies, the Briggs, Champion and Kill Your Idols. In August 2006, the band performed at Death or Glory Fest; two months later, they appeared at Riot Fest.

Critical reception
AllMusic called the album a "melodic thrash-fest [that] proves the band is vital as ever." Punknews.org wrote that the album is "literally three-chord choruses, battering drums and of course Kevin Seconds' genuine, glorious, high-pitched vocals supported by the wow-ing backings."

Track listing 
All songs written by Kevin Seconds, except for where noted.
 "All Came Undone" - 0:58
 "Meant to Be My Own" - 1:50
 "This Is Temporary" - 1:17
 "My Band, Our Crew" - 2:05
 "Still on It" - 2:48
 "Say My Thanks" - 1:15
 "Big Fall" - 1:11
 "Stand Here and Just Stare" - 1:23
 "Where Is the Danger?" - 1:47
 "Big Hardcore Mystery" - 2:22
 "Panic Attack" - 1:43
 "Our Core" - 1:14
 "Breaking News" - 1:34
 "One Friend Too Many" - 1:37
 "Y.P.H." (Seconds, Bob Adams, Steve Youth, Troy Mowat) - 2:31
 "Your Frustration" - 1:15
 "Rules to Follow" - 1:25

Personnel
 Kevin Seconds – lead vocals 
 Bob Adams – guitar, vocals 
 Troy Mowat – drums 
 Steve Youth – bass, piano

References

2005 albums
7 Seconds (band) albums
SideOneDummy Records albums